Mesita is an unincorporated community located in Costilla County, Colorado, United States. The San Luis post office  serves Mesita postal addresses.

Reported UFO Activity 
Mesita is reportedly the site of some of the San Luis Valley cow mutilations. Two cows and one horse were found east of Mesita with unexplainable mutilations, including a rectal coring, and signs of being dropped from a great height.

Geography 
Mesita is located at  (37.097908,-105.602131).

References 

Unincorporated communities in Costilla County, Colorado
Unincorporated communities in Colorado